
Kartsakhi Lake (Georgian: კარწახის ტბა, karts'akhis tba), or Lake Khozapini (khozap'inis tba; Turkish: Hazapin Gölü), or Lake Aktaş,  is a soda lake in the Caucasus Mountains. It straddles the international border between Georgia (53%) and Turkey (47%).  The village of Kartsakhi lies near the lake's northeastern shore.

It is the second largest lake in Georgia, covering an area of 26.3 or 26.6 square kilometers at an altitude of 1799 m. It is fed by a number of creeks. During the rainy season, its excess water discharges into the Kura River.

Fauna 
It is an important bird habitat; it holds one of the largest populations of the Eurasian eagle-owl in the country, along with populations of the Dalmatian pelican and great white pelican.

References

Lakes of Georgia (country)
Geography of Samtskhe–Javakheti
Lakes of Turkey
Landforms of Ardahan Province
Important Bird Areas of Georgia
International lakes of Asia
Georgia (country)–Turkey border
Çıldır District
Important Bird Areas of Turkey